= David Stefanović =

Swiss footballer (born 2001)

Personal information
- Date of birth: 13 March 2001 (age 25)
- Height: 1.78 m (5 ft 10 in)
- Position: Midfielder

Team information
- Current team: Chiasso
- Number: 29

Youth career
- 2014–2020: Lugano

Senior career*
Years	Team	Apps	(Gls)
2020–2021	Lugano	1	(0)
2021–	Chiasso	0	(0)
- * Club domestic league appearances and goals as of 19 September 2021

David Stefanović (born David Jovanović, 13 March 2001) is a Swiss professional footballer who plays for Chiasso. While he primarily plays on the left of midfield, he can also play fullback, centrally and on the right hand side of the pitch.

== Professional career ==
Stefanovic made his professional debut with FC Lugano in a 1-0 Swiss Super League win over Neuchâtel Xamax on 3 August 2020.

On 7 July 2021, he signed with Chiasso.

== Personal life ==
Born in Switzerland, Stefanovic is of Serbian descent. Stefanovic originally went by David Jovanovic but changed his name in January 2021 for unknown reasons.
